Guillermo Pacheco Pulido (born 8 February 1933) is a Mexican politician. On 21 January 2019, the Congress of Puebla elected him as acting Governor of Puebla, a position that he served until July 31 of the same year.

References

1933 births
Living people
Presidents of the Chamber of Deputies (Mexico)
20th-century Mexican politicians
21st-century Mexican politicians
Governors of Puebla
Institutional Revolutionary Party politicians
Politicians from Puebla
People from Puebla (city)